Three States may refer to:

Three States, Louisiana and Texas, an unincorporated community
Three States, Missouri, a ghost town